The FIS Ski Flying World Championships 2018 was the 25th ski flying world championships. It was held between 18 and 21 January 2018 in Oberstdorf, Germany and for the sixth time on this location. They hosted world championships at Heini-Klopfer-Skiflugschanze already in 1973, 1981, 1988, 1998 and 2008. There was total prize money of 142,000 swiss francs (72,000 for individual and 70,000 for team event).

Peter Prevc was the defending individual champion and Norway (Anders Fannemel, Johann André Forfang, Daniel-André Tande and Kenneth Gangnes) was defending the team title.

Daniel-André Tande became the new individual world champion and Norway (Robert Johansson, Andreas Stjernen, Johann André Forfang and Daniel-André Tande) took the team title.

Prize money 

A total prize of 142,000 swiss francs was awarded: 72,000 CHF to the Top6 individuals and 70,000 CHF to the Top3 teams.

Schedule

Previous championships 
All previous ski flying world championships held in Oberstdorf:

Results

Qualifying

Trial rounds

Competition

Individual

Team

References

External links 

Official website 

FIS Ski Flying World Championships
2018 in ski jumping
2018 in German sport
Skiing competitions in Germany
International sports competitions hosted by Germany
January 2018 sports events in Germany